Žan Majer (born 25 July 1992) is a Slovenian professional footballer who plays as a central midfielder for Italian  club Reggina.

Club career
On 26 June 2017, Majer signed a three-year contract with one-year extension option with the Russian Premier League club Rostov. On 1 February 2019, Majer was released from his Rostov contract by mutual consent.

On 20 February 2019, he joined the Serie B team Lecce on a six-month deal. He made his Serie B debut on 23 February against Cittadella.

On 31 July 2022, Majer signed a multi-year contract with Reggina.

Career statistics

Club

References

External links
National team stats 

1992 births
Living people
Sportspeople from Maribor
Slovenian footballers
Association football midfielders
Slovenian expatriate footballers
Slovenia under-21 international footballers
Slovenia international footballers
Slovenian Second League players
Slovenian PrvaLiga players
Russian Premier League players
Serie B players
Serie A players
NK Aluminij players
NK Domžale players
FC Rostov players
U.S. Lecce players
Reggina 1914 players
Slovenian expatriate sportspeople in Russia
Expatriate footballers in Russia
Slovenian expatriate sportspeople in Italy
Expatriate footballers in Italy